The FÉG 35M was a bolt-action rifle, chambered in 8×56mmR. Though superficially still resembling the 95/31M Carbine it was a new design with a cock-on-close bolt. An easily recognizable distinguishing feature was the placement of the bolt handle, which was further forward than in the 1895 design. It was used by Hungary in the years leading up to and during World War II, and after World War II before being gradually phased out by both Red Army surplus and locally produced Mosin–Nagant carbines.

Design details
After the Great War, modifications were made on the 95M carbines, recalibrating the sights to the newly adopted metric system, and later adopting the Austrian-developed more powerful spitzer cartridge, all this resulting in the 31M rifle. But the army was not satisfied. Analysing World War I performance had revealed several deficiencies: the straight-pull Mannlicher could freeze in great cold; that the bolts were hand-fitted — thus non-interchangeable — and could be replaced only by trained gunsmiths; and the cock-on-opening operation. In the end it was decided that the new rifle should use a simpler, more conventional rotating bolt, and a better bayonet.

For the new requirements the Hungarian military and FÉG took time-proven Mannlicher–Schönauer action derived from Mauser-Schlegelmilch Gewehr 88 bolt, which was also used on Romanian and Dutch Mannlichers. A prototype, known as 33.M, was produced in small series for trials in 1933. The prototype differed from the final 35.M in following:
 G98-type bayonet was replaced with a crosspiece and press stud arrangement modeled on the Berthier from an earlier 1923 prototype, but with a flat blade and not a cruciform proper;
 the bolt handle was moved forward, in front of the receiver bridge, to strengthen the action;
 the metal part of the receiver separating the forearm from the buttstock was moved backward, from around the magazine to the same position as on Lee-Enfield;
 the Arisaka-type sliding receiver cover was abandoned.
About the same time Steyr-Solothurn may have proposed a competitive design based on ŒWG 1917 G98 modernization which was serially produced in China, but it was not adopted.

All the springs in the rifle except the one in the sight are coil springs. The new safety could be engaged both when the rifle was cocked and uncocked. The barrel was lengthened and the distance between front and rear sights was increased. A British-style two-piece stock avoided the need to import extremely dimensionally stable wood.

43M and Gewehr 98/40
During World War II, military cooperation with Germany and a shortage of standard Mauser K98k rifles German army led to modifications to the 35M. It was rechambered to the standard German 7.92×57 IS cartridge with a fully enclosed flush magazine, the bolt handle was made angled, the bayonet socket was changed to accept German bayonets and some alterations was made to the sling mount. In addition, the rifle was adopted to use standard Mauser 5-round charger clips and its sights were recalibrated to match the ballistics of the 7.92mm IS cartridge.

In German service this modified weapon was known as the G98/40. Hungary also adopted this version, slightly modified, as the 43M.

Comparable contemporary firearms
 Steyr M95
 MAS-36
 Type 99 Arisaka
 Karabiner 98k
 Mosin–Nagant
 Lee-Enfield
 Carcano M1938

See also
 List of World War II firearms of Germany
 Weapons employed in the Slovak-Hungarian War

References

External links
 
 

Bolt-action rifles
World War II rifles
Rifles of Hungary
Military equipment introduced in the 1930s